KHNR (690 kHz) is a commercial AM radio station in Honolulu, Hawaii.  It is owned by the Salem Media Group and it broadcasts a conservative talk radio format.  The studios and offices are on North King Street in Honolulu's Kalihi district. 

KHNR is powered at 10,000 watts, using a non-directional antenna.  The transmitter is on Ahul Street in the Kakaako district of Honolulu, on Māmala Bay.  Programming is also heard on 250-watt FM translator K232FL at 94.3 MHz.

Programming
Most of KHNR's weekday schedule is nationally syndicated shows from the Salem Radio Network including Hugh Hewitt, Mike Gallagher, Charlie Kirk, Dennis Prager, Sebastian Gorka and Brandon Tatum.  From Westwood One, KHNR also carries Mark Levin.  

Weekends feature shows on money, health, food and travel.  Syndicated weekend hosts include Rudy Maxa, Eric Metaxas and Jim Daly.  Most hours begin with an update from Fox News Radio.

History

KULA and KKUA
Its original call sign was KULA. It was an affiliate of the ABC Radio Network and carried its schedule of dramas, comedies, news and sports during the "Golden Age of Radio." It was owned by the Pacific Frontier Broadcasting Company with the studios at 1525 Kapiolani Boulevard. 

During the 1960s, 1970s and early 1980s, the station had the call sign KKUA, playing Top 40 hits, aimed at Honolulu's young listeners. In the 1980s, the Top 40 format moved to sister station 93.1 KQMQ-FM, with KKUA 690 switching to a full service, adult contemporary format.  Then from 1987 until 1999, AM 690 simulcast the music on KQMQ-FM 93.1.

KORL and KHCM
On October 13, 1999, the station became the Hawaii affiliate for Radio Disney, making it a children's radio station.  It picked up the call letters of former Top 40 rival KORL on April 26, 2002.  In 2005, Visionary Related Entertainment sold KORL. 

The station then flipped it to a Japanese language format on January 1, 2004.  In 2006, Salem and KORL's owners swapped signals, and in the process moved the KHCM call sign and country music format over to the 690 from the 1180 frequency, which in turn became the new home for KORL.

In 2004, Salem acquired rock station KPOI-FM 105.9 and dropped the format.  The FM station began airing a talk format, giving Hawaii its first FM talk station. KAIM (870 AM) became its simulcast after the switch was made. On September 3, 2007, KHCM switched to both 870 AM and 97.5 FM, keeping its country music format and taking the KHCM call letters for both stations.

KHNR
The talk radio format and KHNR call letters moved to 690 AM. KPOI-FM is now owned by Visionary Related Entertainment and airs a soft adult contemporary sound.  Since 2007, KHNR has carried programming from the Salem Radio Network as a conservative talk station.

Like many Salem talk stations, KHNR calls itself "The Answer."  That branding is also used on Salem's talk station in New York City, WNYM, and on its talk station in Los Angeles, KRLA.

References

External links
FCC History Cards for KHNR
Station website

HNR
Talk radio stations in the United States
Conservative talk radio
Radio stations established in 1947
1947 establishments in Hawaii
Salem Media Group properties